Pancoastburg (originally known as Pancoastburgh) is an unincorporated community and census-designated place (CDP) in Madison Township, Fayette County, Ohio, United States. As of the 2010 census the population of Pancoastburg was 87.

Demographics

History
Samuel Pancoast established a carding mill at Pancoastburg in the 1820s. It was a stage coach stop along the Chillicothe-Urbana line.  The land was then owned by Isaiah Pancoast, who platted the town. The settlers of the area split into two groups, one group stayed in Pancoastburg, and the other settled Yankeetown a short distance away.  About this time, the name of the community was changed to Waterloo.  Yankeetown was short lived, and the settlers that had split off returned to the original site.  By 1860, the name of the community was changed back to Pancoastburg.  The Pancoastburg post office was originally established as "Pancoastburgh" on August 19, 1847. The name was changed to "Pancoastburg" on May 16, 1893, and was discontinued on December 15, 1920.  The mail service is now sent through the Washington Court House branch.

References 

Census-designated places in Fayette County, Ohio
Census-designated places in Ohio
Populated places established in 1847
1847 establishments in Ohio